{{infobox person
| name = Xu Zheng
| image = 
| alt = 
| caption = 
| birth_date = 
| birth_place = Shanghai, China
| alma_mater = Shanghai Theatre Academy
| occupation = Actor, director, screenwriter, producer
| years_active = 1996–present
| spouse = 
| children = 1
| awards = China Movie Channel Media AwardsFavourite Actor2009 One Night in SupermarketBeijing College Student Film FestivalFavourite Director2013 Lost in ThailandChina Film Director's Guild AwardsBest Actor2014 No Man's LandChinese American Film FestivalBest Actor2015 Lost in Hong KongChangchun Film FestivalBest Actor2018 Dying to Survive| module = 
}}
Xu Zheng (born 18 April 1972) is a Chinese actor and director best known for acting in comedic roles. Xu directed, co-wrote, co-produced and starred in Lost in Thailand (2012) and Lost in Hong Kong (2015), two of the highest-grossing films in China. He also co-produced and starred in Dying to Survive (2018). 

Xu found fame with the wacky TV series Sunny Piggy (2000), co-starring his future wife Tao Hong. He gained further recognition after other comedy TV dramas Li Wei the Magistrate (2001) and Love Through Different Times (2002), as well as comedy films Call for Love (2007) and Lost on Journey (2010). Xu has acted in most of Ning Hao's films including No Man's Land (2013) and Breakup Buddies (2014).

Xu ranked 38th on Forbes China Celebrity 100 list in 2013, 68th in 2015, 92nd in 2017, 4th in 2019, and 2nd in 2020.

Biography
Growing up in Shanghai, Xu Zheng performed regularly in Children's Palace theatres. After graduating from Shanghai Theatre Academy in 1994, Xu portrayed mostly minor roles on television and film for years. His big break came in 2000 with the silly romance TV series Sunny Piggy, in which he portrayed the dimwitted protagonist Zhu Bajie. Sunny Piggy received high ratings nationally, paving way for other popular TV dramas such as Li Wei the Magistrate (2001) and Love Through Different Times (2002). Since appearing in Ning Hao's Crazy Stone (2006), Xu also began to turn more and more to comedy films, starring in Call for Love (2007) and One Night in Supermarket (2009). He also worked with Ning Hao again in Crazy Racer (2009) and No Man's Land (2013).

Xu had wanted to try his hands in filmmaking since acting was, in his words, "too passive". After the success of the comedy road film Lost on Journey (2010), Xu invited his co-star Wang Baoqiang to join his directorial debut Lost in Thailand, a film with the same premise. However, as a first-time director, Xu had a difficult time selling his story, meeting with 3 different production companies before convincing Beijing Enlight Pictures to invest US$4 million. Huang Bo, Xu's good friend and frequent co-star in Ning's films, also joined the project. Released in December 2012, Lost in Thailand raked in over US$200 million from about 40 million people to become the highest-grossing domestic film in China's history. Shot mainly in Thailand, the film greatly boosted tourism to the country, and Xu even received a private meeting with the Thai prime minister Yingluck Shinawatra in 2013.

In 2014, Ning's comedy road film Breakup Buddies starring Xu and Huang Bo grossed over US$195 million to become the highest-grossing domestic film of the year. Xu's second directorial feature Lost in Hong Kong (2015), which he again starred-in, co-wrote and co-produced, broke Lost in Thailands Chinese 2-D film grossing record with US$250 million.

Personal life
Xu Zheng first shaved his head while in college, and has been sporting his bald head ever since.

Xu married his Sunny Piggy co-star Tao Hong in 2002. They have portrayed a married couple in Unfinished Girl (2007) and Lost in Thailand. Other collaborations include Sky Lovers (2002 TV series), No Lonely Angels (2002 film), The Last Red Hot Lover (2005–06 theatre production), No Man's Land, and How Long Will I Love U. Tao also made a cameo in Lost in Hong Kong. Their daughter was born on December 30, 2008, in Beijing.

Filmography

Film

Miniseries

TV series

Reality shows
2016: Twenty-Four Hours (二十四小时) on Zhejiang Television
2016: Lost in Food (食在囧途) on Zhejiang Television
2018: I Am an Actor (我就是演员) on Zhejiang Television

Theatre
A member of the Shanghai Dramatic Arts Centre, Xu was a stage star before finding fame in television and film. He starred in Chinese versions of The Liar (as Lelio), Long Day's Journey into Night (as Jamie), Much Ado About Nothing (as Antonio), and Art (as Serge), as well as many Chinese plays in both Mandarin and Shanghainese. He also directed at least 3 plays as early as 1998. In 2005, he and Tao Hong starred in a 2-person play adapted from the Broadway comedy Last of the Red Hot Lovers, which caused a sensation in Beijing. The couple subsequently performed the play over 30 times in 10 major cities, receiving overwhelming support everywhere that they canceled their holiday travel plans for more performances.

Awards and nominations

References

External links
 

1972 births
Living people
Male actors from Shanghai
Chinese male film actors
Chinese male television actors
Chinese male stage actors
Chinese male voice actors
Film directors from Shanghai
Chinese filmmakers
Chinese theatre directors
Shanghai Theatre Academy alumni
20th-century Chinese male actors
21st-century Chinese male actors
Participants in Chinese reality television series